The Journal of Intelligence History is a biannual peer-reviewed academic journal covering the history of espionage. It was established in 2001  and is the official journal of the International Intelligence History Association. The journal is published by Taylor & Francis and the editors-in-chief are Chris Moran (University of Warwick) and Shlomo Shpiro (Bar-Ilan University). Scholars have acknowledged its role.

References

External links 
 
International Intelligence History Association

Taylor & Francis academic journals
Publications established in 2001
English-language journals
Military history journals
History of espionage
Biannual journals